The 65th United States Congress was a meeting of the legislative branch of the United States federal government, composed of the United States Senate and the United States House of Representatives. It met in Washington, D.C., from March 4, 1917, to March 4, 1919, during the fifth and sixth years of Woodrow Wilson's presidency. The apportionment of seats in this House of Representatives was based on the 1910 United States census.

The Senate maintained a Democratic majority.  In the House, the Republicans had actually won a plurality, but as the Progressives and Socialist Representative Meyer London caucused with the Democrats, this gave them the operational majority of the nearly evenly divided chamber, thus giving the Democrats full control of Congress, and along with President Wilson maintaining an overall federal government trifecta.

Major events

 March 4, 1917: Jeannette Rankin of Montana became the first woman member of the United States House of Representatives.
 March 8, 1917: The United States Senate adopted the cloture rule to limit filibusters.
 April 2, 1917: World War I: President Woodrow Wilson asks the U.S. Congress for a declaration of war on Germany.
 March 4, 1918: A soldier at Camp Funston, Kansas, fell sick with the first confirmed case of the Spanish flu.

Major legislation

 April 6, 1917: Declaration of war against Germany, Sess. 1 ch. 1, 
 April 24, 1917: First Liberty Bond Act, Sess. 1, ch. 4, 
 May 12, 1917: Enemy Vessel Confiscation Joint Resolution, 
 May 12, 1917: First Army Appropriations Act of 1917, 
 May 18, 1917: Selective Service Act of 1917, Sess. 1, ch. 15, 
 May 29, 1917: Esch Car Service Act of 1917, Sess. 1, ch. 23, 
 June 15, 1917: Emergency Shipping Fund Act of 1917, c. 29, 
 June 15, 1917: Second Army Appropriations Act of 1917, 
 June 15, 1917: Espionage Act of 1917, Sess. 1, ch. 30,  (incl. title XI: Search Warrant Act of 1917)
 July 24, 1917: Aviation Act of 1917, ch. 40, 
 August 8, 1917: River and Harbor Act of 1917, Sess. 1, ch. 49, 
 August 10, 1917: Priority of Shipments Act of 1917 (Obstruction of Interstate Commerce Act of 1917), Sess. 1, ch. 51, 
 August 10, 1917: Food and Fuel Control Act (Lever Act), Sess. 1, ch. 53, 
 October 1, 1917: Second Liberty Bond Act, Sess. 1, ch. 56, 
 October 1, 1917: Aircraft Board Act of 1917, Sess. 1, ch. 61, 
 October 3, 1917: War Revenue Act of 1917, Sess. 1, ch. 63, 
 October 5, 1917: Repatriation Act of 1917, Sess. 1, ch. 68, 
 October 6, 1917: Federal Explosives Act of 1917, Sess. 1, ch. 83, 
 October 6, 1917: War Risk Insurance Act of 1917, Sess. 1, ch. 105, 
 October 6, 1917: International Emergency Economic Powers Act (Trading with the Enemy Act), Sess. 1, ch. 106, 
 December 7, 1917: Declaration of war against Austria–Hungary, Sess. 2, ch. 1, 
 February 24, 1918: Revenue Act of 1918, Sess. 2, ch. 18, 
 March 8, 1918: Soldiers' and Sailors' Civil Relief Act, Sess. 2, ch. 20, 
 March 19, 1918: Standard Time Act of 1918 (Calder Act), Sess. 2, ch. 24, 
 March 21, 1918: Federal Control Act of 1918, Sess. 2, ch. 25, 
 April 4, 1918: Third Liberty Bond Act, Sess. 2, ch. 44, 
 April 5, 1918: War Finance Corporation Act, Sess. 2, ch. 45, 
 April 10, 1918: Webb–Pomerene Act, Sess. 2, ch. 50, 
 April 18, 1918: American Forces Abroad Indemnity Act, Sess. 2, ch. 57, 
 April 20, 1918: Destruction of War Materials Act, Sess. 2, ch. 59, 
 April 23, 1918: Pittman Act, Sess. 2, ch. 63, 
 May 9, 1918: Alien Naturalization Act, Sess. 2, ch. 69, 
 May 16, 1918: Housing Act, Sess. 2, ch. 74, 
 May 16, 1918: Sedition Act of 1918, Sess. 2, ch. 75, 
 May 20, 1918: Departmental Reorganization Act (Overman Act), Sess. 2, ch. 78, 
 May 22, 1918: Wartime Measure Act of 1918, Sess. 2, ch. 81, 
 May 31, 1918: Saulsbury Resolution, Sess. 2, ch. 90, 
 June 27, 1918: Veterans Rehabilitation Act (Smith–Sears Act), Sess. 2, ch. 107, 
 July 3, 1918: Migratory Bird Treaty Act of 1918, Sess. 2, ch. 128, 
 July 9, 1918: Fourth Liberty Bond Act, Sess. 2, ch. 142, 
 July 9, 1918: Army Appropriations Act of 1918, Sess. 2, ch. 143,  (incl. ch. 15: Public Health and Research Act of 1918 (Chamberlain–Kahn Act))
 July 18, 1918: River and Harbor Act of 1918, Sess. 2, ch. 155, 
 July 18, 1918: Charter Rate and Requisition Act of 1918, Sess. 2, ch. 157, 
 October 16, 1918: Immigration Act of 1918 (Dillingham–Hardwick Act), Sess. 2, ch. 186, 
 October 16, 1918: Corrupt Practices Act of 1918 (Gerry Act), Sess. 2, ch. 187, 
 November 7, 1918: National Bank Consolidation Act of 1918, Sess. 2, ch. 209, 
 November 21, 1918: Food Production Stimulation Act (War–Time Prohibition Act), Sess. 2, ch. 212, 
 February 24, 1919: Child Labor Act of 1919, Sess. 3, ch. 18, 
 February 26, 1919: Grand Canyon National Park Act of 1919, Sess. 3, ch. 44, 
 February 26, 1919: Acadia National Park Act of 1919, Sess. 3, ch. 45, 
 March 2, 1919: War Risk Insurance Act of 1919 (War Minerals Relief Act of 1919, Dent Act), Sess. 3, ch. 94, 
 March 2, 1919: River and Harbors Act of 1919, Sess. 3, ch. 95, 
 March 3, 1919: Hospitalization Act of 1919, Sess. 3, ch. 98, 
 March 3, 1919: Fifth Liberty Bond Act, Sess. 3, ch. 100, 
 March 4, 1919: Wheat Price Guarantee Act, Sess. 3, ch. 125,

Major resolutions 
April 3, 1918 American's Creed (House)

Constitutional amendments 

December 18, 1917: Approved an amendment to the United States Constitution declaring the production, transport, and sale of alcohol (though not the consumption or private possession) illegal, and submitted it to the state legislatures for ratification
 Amendment was later ratified on January 16, 1919, becoming the Eighteenth Amendment to the United States Constitution

Party summary

Senate

House of Representatives

Leadership

Senate leadership

Presiding
President: Thomas R. Marshall (D)
President pro tempore: Willard Saulsbury Jr. (D)
Majority Whip: J. Hamilton Lewis (D)
Minority Whip: Charles Curtis (R)
Republican Conference Chairman: Jacob Harold Gallinger (until August 17, 1918)
 Henry Cabot Lodge (from 1918)
 Democratic Caucus Chairman : Thomas S. Martin
 Republican Conference Secretary: James Wolcott Wadsworth Jr.
 Democratic Caucus Secretary: William H. King

House leadership

Presiding
Speaker: Champ Clark (D)

Majority (Democratic) leadership
Majority Leader: Claude Kitchin
Majority Whip: vacant
 Democratic Caucus Chairman: Edward W. Saunders
 Democratic Campaign Committee Chairman: Scott Ferris

Minority (Republican) leadership
Minority Leader: James R. Mann
Minority Whip: Charles M. Hamilton
 Republican Conference Chairman: William S. Greene
 Republican Campaign Committee Chairman: Frank P. Woods

Members 

Skip to House of Representatives, below

Senate
Because of the 17th Amendment, starting in 1914 U.S. senators were directly elected instead of by the state legislatures. However, this did not affect the terms of U.S. senators whose terms had started before that Amendment took effect, In this Congress, Class 2 meant their term ended with this Congress, requiring reelection in 1918; Class 3 meant their term began in the last Congress, requiring reelection in 1920; and Class 1 meant their term began in this Congress, requiring reelection in 1922.

Alabama 
 2. John H. Bankhead (D)
 3. Oscar W. Underwood (D)

Arizona 
 1. Henry F. Ashurst (D)
 3. Marcus A. Smith (D)

Arkansas 
 2. Joseph T. Robinson (D)
 3. William F. Kirby (D)

California 
 1. Hiram Johnson (R)
 3. James D. Phelan (D)

Colorado 
 2. John F. Shafroth (D)
 3. Charles S. Thomas (D)

Connecticut 
 1. George P. McLean (R)
 3. Frank B. Brandegee  (R)

Delaware 
 1. Josiah O. Wolcott (D)
 2. Willard Saulsbury Jr. (D)

Florida 
 1. Park Trammell (D)
 3. Duncan U. Fletcher (D)

Georgia 
 2. Thomas W. Hardwick (D)
 3. Hoke Smith (D)

Idaho 
 2. William E. Borah (R)
 3. James H. Brady (R), until January 13, 1918 
 John F. Nugent (D), from January 22, 1918

Illinois 
 2. James Hamilton Lewis (D)
 3. Lawrence Y. Sherman (R)

Indiana 
 1. Harry S. New (R)
 3. James E. Watson (R)

Iowa 
 2. William S. Kenyon (R)
 3. Albert B. Cummins (R)

Kansas 
 2. William H. Thompson (D)
 3. Charles Curtis (R)

Kentucky 
 2. Ollie M. James (D), until August 28, 1918 
 George B. Martin (D), from September 7, 1918
 3. J. C. W. Beckham (D)

Louisiana 
 2. Joseph E. Ransdell (D)
 3. Robert F. Broussard (D), until April 12, 1918
 Walter Guion (D), April 22, 1918 – November 5, 1918 
 Edward J. Gay (D), from November 6, 1918

Maine 
 1. Frederick Hale (R)
 2. Bert M. Fernald (R)

Maryland 
 1. Joseph I. France (R)
 3. John Walter Smith (D)

Massachusetts 
 1. Henry Cabot Lodge (R)
 2. John W. Weeks (R)

Michigan 
 1. Charles E. Townsend (R)
 2. William Alden Smith (R)

Minnesota 
 1. Frank B. Kellogg (R)
 2. Knute Nelson (R)

Mississippi 
 1. John Sharp Williams (D)
 2. James K. Vardaman (D)

Missouri 
 1. James A. Reed (D)
 3. William J. Stone (D), until April 14, 1918 
 Xenophon P. Wilfley (D), April 30, 1918 – November 5, 1918 
 Selden P. Spencer (R), from November 6, 1918

Montana 
 1. Henry L. Myers (D)
 2. Thomas J. Walsh (D)

Nebraska 
 1. Gilbert M. Hitchcock (D)
 2. George W. Norris (R)

Nevada 
 1. Key Pittman (D)
 3. Francis G. Newlands (D), until December 24, 1917 
 Charles B. Henderson (D), from January 12, 1918

New Hampshire 
 2. Henry F. Hollis (D)
 3. Jacob H. Gallinger (R), until August 17, 1918
 Irving W. Drew (R), September 2, 1918 – November 5, 1918
 George H. Moses (R), from November 6, 1918

New Jersey 
 1. Joseph S. Frelinghuysen (R)
 2. William Hughes (D), until January 30, 1918 
 David Baird (R), from February 23, 1918

New Mexico 
 1. Andrieus A. Jones (D)
 2. Albert B. Fall (R)

New York 
 1. William M. Calder (R)
 3. James W. Wadsworth Jr. (R)

North Carolina 
 2. Furnifold M. Simmons (D)
 3. Lee S. Overman (D)

North Dakota 
 1. Porter J. McCumber (R)
 3. Asle J. Gronna (R)

Ohio 
 1. Atlee Pomerene (D)
 3. Warren G. Harding (R)

Oklahoma 
 2. Robert L. Owen (D)
 3. Thomas P. Gore (D)

Oregon 
 2. Harry Lane (D), until May 23, 1917 
 Charles L. McNary (R), May 29, 1917 – November 5, 1918
 Frederick W. Mulkey (R), November 6, 1918  – December 17, 1918
 Charles L. McNary (R), from December 18, 1918
 3. George E. Chamberlain (D)

Pennsylvania 
 1. Philander C. Knox (R)
 3. Boies Penrose (R)

Rhode Island 
 1. Peter G. Gerry (D)
 2. LeBaron B. Colt (R)

South Carolina 
 2. Benjamin R. Tillman (D), until July 3, 1918 
 Christie Benet (D), July 6, 1918 – November 5, 1918
 William P. Pollock (D), from November 6, 1918
 3. Ellison D. Smith (D)

South Dakota 
 2. Thomas Sterling (R)
 3. Edwin S. Johnson (D)

Tennessee 
 1. Kenneth D. McKellar (D)
 2. John K. Shields (D)

Texas 
 1. Charles A. Culberson (D)
 2. Morris Sheppard (D)

Utah 
 1. William H. King (D)
 3. Reed Smoot (R)

Vermont 
 1. Carroll S. Page (R)
 3. William P. Dillingham (R)

Virginia 
 1. Claude A. Swanson (D)
 2. Thomas S. Martin (D)

Washington 
 1. Miles Poindexter (R)
 3. Wesley L. Jones (R)

West Virginia 
 1. Howard Sutherland (R)
 2. Nathan Goff (R) until

Wisconsin 
 1. Robert M. La Follette (R)
 2. Paul O. Husting (D), until October 21, 1917
 2. Irvine Lenroot (R), from April 8, 1918

Wyoming 
 1. John B. Kendrick (D)
 2. Francis E. Warren (R)

House of Representatives

Alabama 
 . Oscar Lee Gray (D)
 . S. Hubert Dent Jr. (D)
 . Henry B. Steagall (D)
 . Fred L. Blackmon (D)
 . J. Thomas Heflin (D)
 . William B. Oliver (D)
 . John L. Burnett (D)
 . Edward B. Almon (D)
 . George Huddleston (D)
 . William B. Bankhead (D)

Arizona 
 . Carl Hayden (D)

Arkansas 
 . Thaddeus H. Caraway (D)
 . William A. Oldfield (D)
 . John N. Tillman (D)
 . Otis Wingo (D)
 . Henderson M. Jacoway (D)
 . Samuel M. Taylor (D)
 . William S. Goodwin (D)

California 
 . Clarence F. Lea (D)
 . John E. Raker (D)
 . Charles F. Curry (R)
 . Julius Kahn (R)
 . John I. Nolan (R)
 . John A. Elston (Prog.)
 . Denver S. Church (D)
 . Everis A. Hayes (R)
 . Charles H. Randall (Proh.)
 . Henry Z. Osborne (R)
 . William Kettner (D)

Colorado 
 . Benjamin Clark Hilliard (D)
 . Charles Bateman Timberlake (R)
 . Edward Keating (D)
 . Edward Thomas Taylor (D)

Connecticut 
 . Augustine Lonergan (D)
 . Richard P. Freeman (R)
 . John Q. Tilson (R)
 . Ebenezer J. Hill (R), until September 27, 1917
 Schuyler Merritt (R), from November 6, 1917
 . James P. Glynn (R)

Delaware 
 . Albert F. Polk (D)

Florida 
 . Herbert J. Drane (D)
 . Frank Clark (D)
 . Walter Kehoe (D)
 . William J. Sears (D)

Georgia 
 . James W. Overstreet (D)
 . Frank Park (D)
 . Charles R. Crisp (D)
 . William C. Adamson (D), until December 18, 1917
 William C. Wright (D), from January 16, 1918
 . William S. Howard (D)
 . James W. Wise (D)
 . Gordon Lee (D)
 . Charles H. Brand (D)
 . Thomas Montgomery Bell (D)
 . Carl Vinson (D)
 . John R. Walker (D)
 . William W. Larsen (D)

Idaho 
 . Addison T. Smith (R)
 . Burton L. French (R)

Illinois 
 . Medill McCormick (R)
 . William E. Mason (R)
 . Martin B. Madden (R)
 . James R. Mann (R)
 . William W. Wilson (R)
 . Charles Martin (D), until October 28, 1917
 John W. Rainey (D), from April 2, 1918
 . Adolph J. Sabath (D)
 . James McAndrews (D)
 . Niels Juul (R)
 . Thomas Gallagher (D)
 . Frederick A. Britten (R)
 . George E. Foss (R)
 . Ira C. Copley (R)
 . Charles Eugene Fuller (R)
 . John C. McKenzie (R)
 . William J. Graham  (R)
 . Edward John King  (R)
 . Clifford Ireland (R)
 . John A. Sterling  (R), until October 17, 1918
 . Joseph G. Cannon (R)
 . William B. McKinley (R)
 . Henry T. Rainey (D)
 . Loren E. Wheeler (R)
 . William A. Rodenberg (R)
 . Martin D. Foster (D)
 . Thomas S. Williams (R)
 . Edward E. Denison (R)

Indiana 
 . George K. Denton (D)
 . Oscar E. Bland (R)
 . William E. Cox (D)
 . Lincoln Dixon (D)
 . Everett Sanders (R)
 . Daniel Webster Comstock (R), until May 19, 1917
 Richard N. Elliott (R), from June 29, 1917
 . Merrill Moores (R)
 . Albert H. Vestal (R)
 . Fred S. Purnell (R)
 . William R. Wood (R)
 . Milton Kraus (R)
 . Louis W. Fairfield (R)
 . Henry A. Barnhart (D)

Iowa 
 . Charles A. Kennedy (R)
 . Harry E. Hull (R)
 . Burton E. Sweet (R)
 . Gilbert N. Haugen (R)
 . James W. Good (R)
 . C. William Ramseyer (R)
 . Cassius C. Dowell (R)
 . Horace M. Towner (R)
 . William R. Green (R)
 . Frank P. Woods (R)
 . George Cromwell Scott (R)

Kansas 
 . Daniel Read Anthony Jr. (R)
 . Edward C. Little (R)
 . Philip P. Campbell (R)
 . Dudley Doolittle (D)
 . Guy T. Helvering (D)
 . John R. Connelly (D)
 . Jouett Shouse (D)
 . William A. Ayres (D)

Kentucky 
 . Alben Barkley (D)
 . David Hayes Kincheloe (D)
 . Robert Y. Thomas Jr. (D)
 . Ben Johnson (D)
 . J. Swagar Sherley (D)
 . Arthur B. Rouse (D)
 . J. Campbell Cantrill (D)
 . Harvey Helm (D), until March 3, 1919
 . William Jason Fields (D)
 . John W. Langley (R)
 . Caleb Powers (R)

Louisiana 
 . Albert Estopinal (D)
 . Henry Garland Dupré (D)
 . Whitmell P. Martin (Prog.)
 . John Thomas Watkins (D)
 . Riley Joseph Wilson (D)
 . Jared Y. Sanders Sr. (D)
 . Ladislas Lazaro (D)
 . James Benjamin Aswell (D)

Maine 
 . Louis B. Goodall (R)
 . Wallace H. White Jr. (R)
 . John A. Peters (R)
 . Ira G. Hersey (R)

Maryland 
 . Jesse D. Price (D)
 . Joshua Frederick Cockey Talbott (D), until October 5, 1918
 Carville Benson (D), from November 5, 1918
 . Charles P. Coady (D)
 . J. Charles Linthicum (D)
 . Sydney Emanuel Mudd II (R)
 . Frederick N. Zihlman (R)

Massachusetts 
 .  Allen T. Treadway (R)
 . Frederick H. Gillett (R)
 . Calvin D. Paige (R)
 . Samuel E. Winslow (R)
 . John J. Rogers (R)
 . Augustus P. Gardner (R), until May 15, 1917
 Willfred W. Lufkin (R), from November 6, 1917
 . Michael F. Phelan (D)
 . Frederick W. Dallinger (R)
 . Alvan T. Fuller (R)
 . Peter F. Tague (D)
 . George H. Tinkham (R)
 . James A. Gallivan (D)
 . William H. Carter (R)
 . Richard Olney II (D)
 . William S. Greene (R)
 . Joseph Walsh (R)

Michigan 
 . Frank E. Doremus (D)
 . Mark R. Bacon (R), until December 13, 1917
 Samuel Beakes (D), from December 13, 1917
 . John M. C. Smith (R)
 . Edward L. Hamilton (R)
 . Carl Mapes (R)
 . Patrick H. Kelley (R)
 . Louis C. Cramton (R)
 . Joseph W. Fordney (R)
 . James C. McLaughlin (R)
 . Gilbert A. Currie (R)
 . Frank D. Scott (R)
 . W. Frank James (R)
 . Charles Archibald Nichols (R)

Minnesota 
 . Sydney Anderson (R)
 . Franklin Ellsworth (R)
 . Charles Russell Davis (R)
 . Carl Van Dyke (D)
 . Ernest Lundeen (R)
 . Harold Knutson (R)
 . Andrew Volstead (R)
 . Clarence B. Miller (R)
 . Halvor Steenerson (R)
 . Thomas D. Schall (R)

Mississippi 
 . Ezekiel S. Candler Jr. (D)
 . Hubert D. Stephens (D)
 . Benjamin G. Humphreys II (D)
 . Thomas U. Sisson (D)
 . William Webb Venable (D)
 . Pat Harrison (D)
 . Percy E. Quin (D)
 . James W. Collier (D)

Missouri 
 . Milton A. Romjue (D)
 . William W. Rucker (D)
 . Joshua Willis Alexander (D)
 . Charles F. Booher (D)
 . William Patterson Borland (D), until February 20, 1919
 . Clement C. Dickinson (D)
 . Courtney W. Hamlin (D)
 . Dorsey W. Shackleford (D)
 . Champ Clark (D)
 . Jacob Edwin Meeker (R), until October 16, 1918
 Frederick Essen (R), from November 5, 1918
 . William Leo Igoe (D)
 . Leonidas C. Dyer (R)
 . Walter Lewis Hensley (D)
 . Joseph J. Russell (D)
 . Perl D. Decker (D)
 . Thomas L. Rubey (D)

Montana 
 . John M. Evans (D)
 . Jeannette Rankin (R)

Nebraska 
 . C. Frank Reavis (R)
 . Charles O. Lobeck (D)
 . Dan V. Stephens (D)
 . Charles Henry Sloan (R)
 . Ashton C. Shallenberger (D)
 . Moses P. Kinkaid (R)

Nevada 
 . Edwin E. Roberts (R)

New Hampshire 
 . Cyrus A. Sulloway (R), until March 11, 1917
 Sherman Everett Burroughs (R), from May 29, 1917
 . Edward Hills Wason (R)

New Jersey 
 . William J. Browning (R)
 . Isaac Bacharach (R)
 . Thomas J. Scully (D)
 . Elijah C. Hutchinson (R)
 . John H. Capstick (R), until March 17, 1918
 William F. Birch (R), from November 5, 1918
 . John R. Ramsey (R)
 . Dow H. Drukker (R)
 . Edward W. Gray (R)
 . Richard W. Parker (R)
 . Frederick R. Lehlbach (R)
 . John J. Eagan (D)
 . James A. Hamill (D)

New Mexico 
 . William Bell Walton (D)

New York 
 . Frederick C. Hicks (R)
 . C. Pope Caldwell (D)
 . Joseph V. Flynn (D)
 . Harry H. Dale (D), until January 6, 1919
 . James P. Maher (D)
 . Frederick W. Rowe (R)
 . John J. Fitzgerald (D), until December 31, 1917
 John J. Delaney (D), from March 5, 1918
 . Daniel J. Griffin (D), until December 31, 1917
 William E. Cleary (D), from March 5, 1918
 . Oscar W. Swift (R)
 . Reuben L. Haskell (R)
 . Daniel J. Riordan (D)
 . Meyer London (Soc.)
 . Christopher D. Sullivan (D)
 . Fiorello H. LaGuardia (R)
 . Thomas Francis Smith (D), from April 12, 1917
 . Peter J. Dooling (D)
 . John F. Carew (D)
 . George B. Francis (R)
 . Walter M. Chandler (R)
 . Isaac Siegel (R)
 . George Murray Hulbert (D), until January 1, 1918
 Jerome F. Donovan (D), from March 5, 1918
 . Henry Bruckner (D), until December 31, 1917
 Anthony Griffin (D), from March 5, 1918
 . Daniel C. Oliver (D)
 . Benjamin L. Fairchild (R)
 . James W. Husted (R)
 . Edmund Platt (R)
 . Charles B. Ward (R)
 . Rollin B. Sanford (R)
 . James S. Parker (R)
 . George R. Lunn (D)
 . Bertrand H. Snell (R)
 . Luther W. Mott (R)
 . Homer P. Snyder (R)
 . George W. Fairchild (R)
 . Walter W. Magee (R)
 . Norman J. Gould (R)
 . Harry H. Pratt (R)
 . Thomas B. Dunn (R)
 . Archie D. Sanders (R)
 . S. Wallace Dempsey (R)
 . Charles B. Smith (D)
 . William F. Waldow (R)
 . Charles M. Hamilton (R)

North Carolina 
 . John Humphrey Small (D)
 . Claude Kitchin (D)
 . George E. Hood (D)
 . Edward W. Pou (D)
 . Charles M. Stedman (D)
 . Hannibal L. Godwin (D)
 . Leonidas D. Robinson (D)
 . Robert L. Doughton (D)
 . Edwin Y. Webb (D)
 . Zebulon Weaver (D), until March 1, 1919
 James Jefferson Britt (R), from March 1, 1919

North Dakota 
 . Henry Thomas Helgesen (R), until April 10, 1917
 John Miller Baer (R), from July 20, 1917
 . George M. Young (R)
 . Patrick Daniel Norton (R)

Ohio 
 . Nicholas Longworth (R)
 . Victor Heintz (R)
 . Warren Gard (D)
 . Benjamin F. Welty (D)
 . John S. Snook (D)
 . Charles C. Kearns (R)
 . Simeon D. Fess (R)
 . John A. Key (D)
 . Isaac R. Sherwood (D)
 . Robert M. Switzer (R)
 . Horatio C. Claypool (D)
 . Clement L. Brumbaugh  (D)
 . Arthur W. Overmyer (D)
 . Ellsworth R. Bathrick (D), until December 23, 1917
 Martin L. Davey (D), from November 5, 1918
 . George White (D)
 . Roscoe C. McCulloch (R)
 . William A. Ashbrook (D)
 . David Hollingsworth (R)
 . John G. Cooper (R)
 . William Gordon (D)
 . Robert Crosser (D)
 . Henry I. Emerson (R)

Oklahoma 
 . Thomas Alberter Chandler (R)
 . William W. Hastings (D)
 . Charles D. Carter (D)
 . Tom D. McKeown (D)
 . Joseph Bryan Thompson (D)
 . Scott Ferris (D)
 . James V. McClintic (D)
 . Dick Thompson Morgan (R)

Oregon 
 . Willis C. Hawley (R)
 . Nicholas J. Sinnott (R)
 . Clifton N. McArthur (R)

Pennsylvania 
 . Thomas S. Crago (R)
 . John R.K. Scott (R), until January 5, 1919
 . Joseph McLaughlin (R)
 . Mahlon M. Garland (R)
 . William S. Vare (R)
 . George S. Graham (R)
 . J. Hampton Moore (R)
 . George W. Edmonds (R)
 . Peter E. Costello (R)
 . George P. Darrow (R)
 . Thomas S. Butler (R)
 . Henry Winfield Watson (R)
 . William W. Griest (R)
 . John R. Farr (R)
 . Thomas W. Templeton (R)
 . Robert D. Heaton (R)
 . Arthur G. Dewalt (D)
 . Louis T. McFadden (R)
 . Edgar R. Kiess (R)
 . John V. Lesher (D)
 . Benjamin K. Focht (R)
 . Aaron S. Kreider (R)
 . John M. Rose (R)
 . Andrew R. Brodbeck (D)
 . Charles H. Rowland (R)
 . Edward E. Robbins (R), until January 25, 1919
 . Bruce F. Sterling (D)
 . Henry W. Temple (R)
 . Henry A. Clark (R)
 . Henry J. Steele (D)
 . Nathan L. Strong (R)
 . Orrin D. Bleakley (R), until April 3, 1917
 Earl Hanley Beshlin (D), from November 6, 1917
 . Stephen G. Porter (R)
 . M. Clyde Kelly (Prog.)
 . John M. Morin (R)
 . Guy E. Campbell (D)

Rhode Island 
 . George Francis O'Shaunessy (D)
 . Walter Russell Stiness (R)
 . Ambrose Kennedy (R)

South Carolina 
 . Richard S. Whaley (D)
 . James F. Byrnes (D)
 . Fred H. Dominick (D)
 . Samuel J. Nicholls (D)
 . William F. Stevenson (D)
 . J. Willard Ragsdale (D)
 . Asbury F. Lever (D)

South Dakota 
 . Charles H. Dillon (R)
 . Royal C. Johnson (R)
 . Harry L. Gandy (D)

Tennessee 
 . Sam R. Sells (R)
 . Richard W. Austin (R)
 . John Austin Moon (D)
 . Cordell Hull (D)
 . William C. Houston (D)
 . Joseph W. Byrns (D)
 . Lemuel Phillips Padgett (D)
 . Thetus Willrette Sims (D)
 . Finis J. Garrett (D)
 . Hubert Fisher (D)

Texas 
 . Daniel E. Garrett (D)
 . A. Jeff McLemore (D)
 . Eugene Black (D)
 . Martin Dies (D)
 . James Young (D)
 . Sam Rayburn (D)
 . Hatton W. Sumners (D)
 . Rufus Hardy (D)
 . Alexander W. Gregg (D)
 . Joe H. Eagle (D)
 . Joseph J. Mansfield (D)
 . James P. Buchanan (D)
 . Tom T. Connally (D)
 . James Clifton Wilson (D), until March 3, 1919
 . John Marvin Jones (D)
 . James L. Slayden (D)
 . John Nance Garner (D)
 . Thomas L. Blanton (D)

Utah 
 . Milton H. Welling (D)
 . James Henry Mays (D)

Vermont 
 . Frank L. Greene (R)
 . Porter H. Dale (R)

Virginia 
 . William Atkinson Jones (D), until April 17, 1918
 S. Otis Bland (D), from July 2, 1918
 . Edward Everett Holland (D)
 . Andrew Jackson Montague (D)
 . Walter Allen Watson (D)
 . Edward W. Saunders (D)
 . Carter Glass (D), until December 16, 1918
 James P. Woods (D), from February 25, 1919
 . Thomas W. Harrison (D)
 . Charles Creighton Carlin (D)
 . C. Bascom Slemp (R)
 . Henry De Flood (D)

Washington 
 . John F. Miller (R)
 . Lindley H. Hadley (R)
 . Albert Johnson (R)
 . William Leroy La Follette (R)
 . Clarence Cleveland Dill (D)

West Virginia 
 . Matthew M. Neely (D)
 . George M. Bowers (R)
 . Stuart F. Reed (R)
 . Harry C. Woodyard (R)
 . Edward Cooper (R)
 . Adam B. Littlepage (D)

Wisconsin 
 . Henry A. Cooper (R)
 . Edward Voigt (R)
 . John M. Nelson (R)
 . William J. Cary (R)
 . William H. Stafford (R)
 . James H. Davidson (R), until August 6, 1918
 Florian Lampert (R), from November 5, 1918
 . John Jacob Esch (R)
 . Edward E. Browne (R)
 . David G. Classon (R)
 . James A. Frear (R)
 . Irvine L. Lenroot (R), until April 17, 1918
 Adolphus P. Nelson (R), from November 5, 1918

Wyoming 
 . Franklin Wheeler Mondell (R)

Non-voting members 
 . Charles A. Sulzer (D), until January 7, 1919
 James Wickersham (R), from January 7, 1919
 . Jonah Kuhio Kalanianaole (R)
 . Jaime C. De Veyra (Resident Commissioner), (Nac.)
 . Teodoro R. Yangco (Resident Commissioner), (I)
 . Félix Córdova Dávila (Resident Commissioner), (Unionist), from August 7, 1917

Changes in membership
The count below reflects changes from the beginning of the first session of this Congress.

Senate
 Replacements: 17
 Democratic: 3-seat net loss
 Republican: 3-seat net gain
 Deaths: 10
 Resignations: 1
 Vacancy: 0
 Total seats with changes:  10

House of Representatives
 replacements: 23
 Democratic: no net change
 Republican: no net change
 Deaths: 15
 Resignations: 12
 Contested elections: 3
 Total seats with changes: 31

Committees

Senate

 Additional Accommodations for the Library of Congress (Select) (Chairman: Boies Penrose; Ranking Member: William J. Stone)
 Agriculture and Forestry (Chairman: Thomas P. Gore; Ranking Member: Francis E. Warren)
 Appropriations (Chairman: Thomas S. Martin; Ranking Member: Francis E. Warren)
 Audit and Control the Contingent Expenses of the Senate (Chairman: William H. Thompson; Ranking Member: Reed Smoot)
 Banking and Currency (Chairman: Robert L. Owen; Ranking Member: George P. McLean)
 Canadian Relations (Chairman: John B. Kendrick; Ranking Member: Lawrence Y. Sherman)
 Census (Chairman: Morris Sheppard; Ranking Member: Robert M. La Follette)
 Civil Service and Retrenchment (Chairman: Kenneth McKellar; Ranking Member: Albert B. Cummins) 
 Claims (Chairman: Joseph T. Robinson; Ranking Member: Nathan Goff)
 Coast and Insular Survey (Chairman: Willard Saulsbury; Ranking Member: Charles E. Townsend)
 Coast Defenses (Chairman: Charles S. Thomas; Ranking Member: John W. Weeks)
 Commerce (Chairman: Duncan U. Fletcher; Ranking Member: Knute Nelson)
 Conservation of National Resources (Chairman: James K. Vardaman; Ranking Member: Asle Gronna)
 Corporations Organized in the District of Columbia (Chairman: Robert M. La Follette; Ranking Member: William J. Stone)
 Cuban Relations (Chairman: Oscar W. Underwood; Ranking Member: William A. Smith)
 Disposition of Useless Papers in the Executive Departments (Chairman: John W. Weeks; Ranking Member: Henry F. Hollis)
 District of Columbia (Chairman: John W. Smith; Ranking Member: William P. Dillingham)
 Education and Labor (Chairman: Hoke Smith; Ranking Member: William E. Borah)
 Engrossed Bills (Chairman: Francis E. Warren; Ranking Member: Furnifold M. Simmons)
 Enrolled Bills (Chairman: Henry F. Hollis; Ranking Member: Charles Curtis)
 Establish a University in the United States (Select)
 Examine the Several Branches in the Civil Service (Chairman: William A. Smith; Ranking Member: Charles A. Culberson)
 Expenditures in the Department of Agriculture (Chairman: William F. Kirby; Ranking Member: James W. Wadsworth Jr.)
 Expenditures in the Department of Commerce (Chairman: Josiah O. Wolcott; Ranking Member: Albert B. Fall)
 Expenditures in the Interior Department (Chairman: Reed Smoot; Ranking Member: Claude A. Swanson)
 Expenditures in the Department of Justice (Chairman: William E. Borah; Ranking Member: Key Pittman)
 Expenditures in the Department of Labor (Chairman: J.C.W. Beckham; Ranking Member: Nathan Goff)
 Expenditures in the Navy Department (Chairman: Asle Gronna; Ranking Member: William Hughes)
 Expenditures in the Post Office Department (Chairman: William H. King; Ranking Member: William A. Smith)
 Expenditures in the State Department (Chairman: J. Hamilton Lewis; Ranking Member: Boies Penrose)
 Expenditures in the Treasury Department (Chairman: Park Trammell; Ranking Member: Warren G. Harding)
 Expenditures in the War Department (Chairman: Charles E. Townsend; Ranking Member: Charles S. Thomas)
 Finance (Chairman: Furnifold M. Simmons; Ranking Member: Boies Penrose)
 Fisheries (Chairman: John F. Nugent; Ranking Member: Wesley L. Jones)
 Five Civilized Tribes of Indians (Chairman: Knute Nelson; Ranking Member: Benjamin R. Tillman)
 Foreign Relations (Chairman: William J. Stone; Ranking Member: Henry Cabot Lodge) 
 Forest Reservations and the Protection of Game (Chairman: George P. McLean; Ranking Member: Benjamin R. Tillman)
 Geological Survey (Chairman: Albert B. Fall; Ranking Member: Ellison D. Smith)
 Immigration (Chairman: Thomas W. Hardwick; Ranking Member: William P. Dillingham)
 Indian Affairs (Chairman: Henry F. Ashurst; Ranking Member: Robert M. La Follette)
 Indian Depredations (Chairman: Miles Poindexter; Ranking Member: Claude A. Swanson)
 Industrial Expositions (Chairman: N/A; Ranking Member: Asle Gronna)
 Interoceanic Canals (Chairman: John K. Shields; Ranking Member: Frank B. Brandegee)
 Interstate Commerce (Chairman: Ellison D. Smith; Ranking Member: Albert B. Cummins)
 Investigate Trespassers upon Indian Lands (Chairman: Wesley L. Jones; Ranking Member: J.C.W. Beckham)
 Irrigation and Reclamation (Chairman: James D. Phelan; Ranking Member: Wesley L. Jones)
 Judiciary (Chairman: Charles A. Culberson; Ranking Member: Knute Nelson) 
 Library (Chairman: John S. Williams; Ranking Member: Jacob H. Gallinger then John W. Weeks)
 Manufactures (Chairman: James A. Reed; Ranking Member: Robert M. La Follette)
 Military Affairs (Chairman: George E. Chamberlain; Ranking Member: Francis E. Warren)
 Mines and Mining (Chairman: Charles B. Henderson; Ranking Member: Miles Poindexter)
 Mississippi River and its Tributaries (Select) (Chairman: Albert B. Cummins; Ranking Member: John K. Shields)
 National Banks (Chairman: N/A; Ranking Member: Frank B. Kellogg)
 Naval Affairs (Chairman: Benjamin R. Tillman; Ranking Member: Boies Penrose)
 Pacific Islands and Puerto Rico (Chairman: John F. Shafroth; Ranking Member: Miles Poindexter)
 Pacific Railroads (Chairman: Frank B. Brandegee; Ranking Member: James A. Reed)
 Patents (Chairman: Ollie M. James; Ranking Member: Frank B. Brandegee)
 Pensions (Chairman: Thomas J. Walsh; Ranking Member: Porter J. McCumber)
 Philippines (Chairman: Gilbert M. Hitchcock; Ranking Member: George P. McLean)
 Post Office and Post Roads (Chairman: John H. Bankhead; Ranking Member: Boies Penrose)
 Printing (Chairman: Marcus A. Smith; Ranking Member: Reed Smoot)
 Private Land Claims (Chairman: Henry Cabot Lodge; Ranking Member: Benjamin R. Tillman)
 Privileges and Elections (Chairman: Atlee Pomerene; Ranking Member: William P. Dillingham)
 Public Buildings and Grounds (Chairman: Claude A. Swanson; Ranking Member: Francis E. Warren)
 Public Health and National Quarantine (Chairman: Joseph E. Ransdell; Ranking Member: John W. Weeks)
 Public Lands (Chairman: Henry L. Myers; Ranking Member: Reed Smoot)
 Railroads (Chairman: Peter G. Gerry; Ranking Member: George W. Norris)
 Revolutionary Claims (Chairman: Edwin S. Johnson; Ranking Member: Charles Curtis)
 Rules (Chairman: Lee S. Overman; Ranking Member: Jacob H. Gallinger then Francis E. Warren)
 Standards, Weights and Measures (Chairman: William S. Kenyon; Ranking Member: John H. Bankhead)
 Tariff Regulation (Select)
 Territories (Chairman: Key Pittman; Ranking Member: George P. McLean)
 Transportation and Sale of Meat Products (Select) (Chairman: Carroll S. Page; Ranking Member: Benjamin R. Tillman)
 Transportation Routes to the Seaboard (Chairman: Porter J. McCumber; Ranking Member: Morris Sheppard)
 University of the United States (Chairman: William P. Dillingham; Ranking Member: Willard Saulsbury)
 Washington Railway and Electrical Company (Select)
 Whole
 Woman Suffrage (Chairman: Andrieus A. Jones; Ranking Member: Wesley L. Jones)

House of Representatives

 Accounts (Chairman: Frank Park; Ranking Member: Rollin B. Sanford)
 Agriculture (Chairman: Asbury F. Lever; Ranking Member: Gilbert N. Haugen)
 Alcoholic Liquor Traffic (Chairman: Adolph J. Sabath; Ranking Member: Addison T. Smith)
 Appropriations (Chairman: Swagar Sherley; Ranking Member: Frederick H. Gillett)
 Banking and Currency (Chairman: Carter Glass; Ranking Member: Everis A. Hayes) 
 Census (Chairman: Harvey Helm; Ranking Member: Charles A. Nichols)
 Claims (Chairman: Hubert D. Stephens; Ranking Member: George W. Edmonds)
 Coinage, Weights and Measures (Chairman: William A. Ashbrook; Ranking Member: Edwin E. Roberts)
 Disposition of Executive Papers (Chairman: J. Frederick C. Talbott; Ranking Member: Burton L. French)
 District of Columbia (Chairman: Ben Johnson; Ranking Member: William J. Cary)
 Education (Chairman: William J. Sears; Ranking Member: Caleb Powers)
 Election of the President, Vice President and Representatives in Congress (Chairman: William W. Rucker; Ranking Member: Carl E. Mapes)
 Elections No.#1 (Chairman: Riley J. Wilson; Ranking Member: Merrill Moores)
 Elections No.#2 (Chairman: James A. Hamill; Ranking Member: John Jacob Rogers)
 Elections No.#3 (Chairman: Walter A. Watson; Ranking Member: Cassius C. Dowell)
 Enrolled Bills (Chairman: Ladislas Lazaro; Ranking Member: John R. Ramsey)
 Expenditures in the Agriculture Department (Chairman: Robert L. Doughton; Ranking Member: Cassius C. Dowell)
 Expenditures in the Commerce Department (Chairman: Robert Crosser; Ranking Member: Thomas S. Williams)
 Expenditures in the Interior Department (Chairman: William W. Hastings; Ranking Member: Aaron S. Kreider)
 Expenditures in the Justice Department (Chairman: William B. Walton; Ranking Member: Stephen G. Porter)
 Expenditures in the Labor Department (Chairman: Christopher D. Sullivan; Ranking Member: Niels Juul)
 Expenditures in the Navy Department (Chairman: Rufus Hardy; Ranking Member: George E. Foss)
 Expenditures in the Post Office Department (Chairman: Edward Keating; Ranking Member: Harry H. Pratt)
 Expenditures in the State Department (Chairman: Courtney W. Hamlin; Ranking Member: George H. Tinkham)
 Expenditures in the Treasury Department (Chairman: Charles O. Lobeck; Ranking Member: Henry W. Temple)
 Expenditures in the War Department (Chairman: Peter J. Dooling; Ranking Member: Luther W. Mott)
 Expenditures on Public Buildings (Chairman: James V. McClintic; Ranking Member: Edward E. Robbins then Oscar E. Bland)
 Flood Control (Chairman: Benjamin G. Humphreys; Ranking Member: William A. Rodenberg)
 Foreign Affairs (Chairman: Henry D. Flood; Ranking Member: Henry A. Cooper)
 Immigration and Naturalization (Chairman: John L. Burnett; Ranking Member: Everis A. Hayes)
 Indian Affairs (Chairman: Charles D. Carter; Ranking Member: Philip P. Campbell)
 Industrial Arts and Expositions (Chairman: James E. Cantrill; Ranking Member: Frank P. Woods)
 Insular Affairs (Chairman: Finis J. Garrett; Ranking Member: Horace M. Towner)
 Interstate and Foreign Commerce (Chairman: Thetus W. Sims; Ranking Member: John J. Esch)
 Invalid Pensions (Chairman: Isaac R. Sherwood; Ranking Member: John W. Langley)
 Investigate Conditions Interfering with Interstate Commerce between the States of Illinois and Missouri (Select) (Chairman: N/A; Ranking Member: N/A)
 Irrigation of Arid Lands (Chairman: Edward T. Taylor; Ranking Member: Moses P. Kinkaid)
 Judiciary (Chairman: Edwin Y. Webb; Ranking Member: Andrew J. Volstead) 
 Labor (Chairman: James P. Maher; Ranking Member: John M.C. Smith) 
 Library (Chairman: James L. Slayden; Ranking Member: Edward W. Gray)
 Merchant Marine and Fisheries (Chairman: Joshua W. Alexander; Ranking Member: William S. Greene)
 Mileage (Chairman: Clarence C. Dill; Ranking Member: John A. Elston)
 Military Affairs (Chairman: S. Hubert Dent; Ranking Member: Julius Kahn)
 Mines and Mining (Chairman: Martin D. Foster; Ranking Member: Mahlon M. Garland)
 Naval Affairs (Chairman: Lemuel P. Padgett; Ranking Member: Thomas S. Butler)
 Patents (Chairman: Charles B. Smith; Ranking Member: John I. Nolan)
 Pensions (Chairman: John A. Key; Ranking Member: Sam R. Sells)
 Post Office and Post Roads (Chairman: John A. Moon; Ranking Member: Halvor Steenerson)
 Printing (Chairman: Henry A. Barnhart; Ranking Member: Edgar R. Kiess)
 Public Buildings and Grounds (Chairman: Frank Clark; Ranking Member: Richard W. Austin)
 Public Lands (Chairman: Scott Ferris; Ranking Member: Irvine L. Lenroot)
 Railways and Canals (Chairman: Clement Brumbaugh; Ranking Member: William L. La Follette)
 Reform in the Civil Service (Chairman: Hannibal L. Godwin; Ranking Member: Frederick R. Lehlbach)
 Revision of Laws (Chairman: John T. Watkins; Ranking Member: Merrill Moores)
 Rivers and Harbors (Chairman: John H. Small; Ranking Member: Charles A. Kennedy)
 Roads (Chairman: Dorsey W. Shackleford; Ranking Member: Thomas B. Dunn)
 Rules (Chairman: Edward W. Pou; Ranking Member: Philip P. Campbell) 
 Standards of Official Conduct
 Territories (Chairman: William C. Houston; Ranking Member: Albert Johnson)
 War Claims (Chairman: Alexander W. Gregg; Ranking Member: Benjamin K. Focht)
 Water Power (Special) (Chairman: Thetus W. Sims; Ranking Member: N/A)
 Ways and Means (Chairman: Claude Kitchin; Ranking Member: Joseph W. Fordney)
 Woman Suffrage (Chairman: John E. Raker; Ranking Member: Jeannette Rankin)
 Whole

Joint committees
 Conditions of Indian Tribes (Special)
 Disposition of (Useless) Executive Papers
 Interstate Commerce (Chairman: Sen. Ellison D. Smith)
 The Library (Chairman: Sen. John Sharp Williams)
 Postal Salaries
 Printing (Chairman: Sen. Duncan U. Fletcher)
 Reclassification of Salaries

Caucuses
 Democratic (House)
 Democratic (Senate)

Employees

Legislative branch agency directors
Architect of the Capitol: Elliott Woods
Librarian of Congress: Herbert Putnam 
Public Printer of the United States: Cornelius Ford

Senate
Chaplain: F.J. Prettyman (Methodist) 
Secretary: James M. Baker 
Librarian: Edward C. Goodwin
Sergeant at Arms: Charles P. Higgins

House of Representatives
Chaplain: Henry N. Couden (Universalist)
Clerk: South Trimble
Doorkeeper: Joseph J. Sinnott
Postmaster: William M. Dunbar
Clerk at the Speaker's Table: Bennett C. Clark
 Clarence A. Cannon
Reading Clerks: Patrick Joseph Haltigan (D) and H. Martin Williams (R)
Sergeant at Arms: Robert B. Gordon

See also 
 1916 United States elections (elections leading to this Congress)
 1916 United States presidential election
 1916 United States Senate elections
 1916 United States House of Representatives elections
 1918 United States elections (elections during this Congress, leading to the next Congress)
 1918 United States Senate elections
 1918 United States House of Representatives elections

References